Chirocephalus reiseri is a species of crustacean in the family Chirocephalidae. It is endemic to Bosnia and Herzegovina.

References

Sources

Anostraca
Freshwater crustaceans of Europe
Crustaceans described in 1913
Taxonomy articles created by Polbot